An essay on the classification of the parasitic Hymenoptera of Britain which correspond with the Ichneumones minuti of Linnaeus is a Victorian monograph of  entomology published in the Entomological Magazine between 1833 and 1838, by the Irish entomologist Alexander Henry Haliday.

Haliday establishes higher level taxa (families) and describes new genera and species. The synoptic tables and descriptions are in Latin. Characters used are (mainly) morphology of the abdomen and thorax, wing venation, number of antennal segments and number of maxillary palpi segments.

The Essay begins with I Tabula synoptica generum et subgenerum ichneumonum adscitorum Britanniae Synoptic Table of Genera and Subgenera of  Ichneumons Found in Britain (Braconidae). This functions as a dichotomous key.

Part II is Excerptae Quedam e Methodo Chalidum  Parts of a method and groups of chalcids
I Pteromali
II Spalangiae
The collections (other than his own) consulted were those of John Curtis and Mus. Soc. Ent. (Museum of the Entomological Society)

Works consulted (Auctores laudati) were 
Nees (BM) Gesellschaft Naturforsch:freunde zu Berlin Magazin v d 1811-1816(Ichneumones adsciti a Nees von Essenbeck) (sic). This series (1811, 1812,1814, 1816) was the first attempt to establish a hierarchy of classification for the Adsciti or Braconidae. Nees worked in close association with Johann Ludwig Christian Gravenhorst, who had in 1807 published a monograph on the Ichneumonidae). Nees uses word familia to signify groups of species within a genus as well as groups of genera. He gave collective names to these groups (Cheloni, Sigalphi, Microgasteres, Agathides, Bracones ,and Bassi). 
Nees (AA) Acta Nova Physs-med:Academiae Caesar:Leopold Naturae Curiosorum( Conspectus Ichneumonum:linea2 ab eodem)-Laudatum in Ichneumonal Europ.
Nees Hymenopterorum Ichneumonibus affinium monographiae (1834, 2 vols.) Parts of the Essay after 1834
Johann Karl Wilhelm Illiger, 1807. Fauna Etrusca. Sistens Insecta quae in provinciis Florentina et Pisana praesertim collegit Petrus Rossius in regio Pisano athenaeo publ.prof. et soc. Ital. Vol. 2. Iterum edita et annotatis perpetuis aucta a D. Carolo Illiger. Helmstadii, Litteris C. G. Fleckeisen.
Carl Fredrik Fallén, 1813. Specimen Novam Hymenoptera Disponendi Methodum Exhibens. Dissertation. Berling, Lund. pp. 1–41. 1 pl.
Dalman, 1820, Försök till Uppställning af Insect-familjen Pteromalini, i synnerhet med afseen de på de i Sverige funne Arter. (Fortsättning) Kungliga Svenska Vetenskapsakademiens Handlingar 41(2):340-385 and 1823, Analeceta Entomologica :viii+108pp, 4 pls Stockholm 
John Curtis various dated folios British Entomology 
John Curtis 1829 A guide to the arrangement of British insects

"Of the Ichneumones of the Second Line, (Ichneumones adsciti, Essenbeck)
The authors who have treated of the family at large are enumerated and noticed in detail by Professor Gravenhorst, in the Prolegomena to his History of European Ichneumones. It was not till the year 1811 that this supplemental branch was distinguished from the proper Ichneumones, by Doctor Nees von Essenbeck, whose system is more fully unfolded in the ninth volume of the New Series of Transactions, published by the Imperial Academy of the Physical Sciences, and has been followed by modern entomologists with few exceptions . That of Spinola, which Latreille adopted, and has adhered to in his latest works, differs in result as detailed by them from that first mentioned, only as respects the genus Agathis, whose affinity to Bracones is admitted by Latreille himself. But, accurately examined, this method will be found to fail, as the variations of the palpi (on which it is founded) are much more extensive than those it comprehends. That of Von Essenbeck is therefore as superior in certainty as it is in facility of application; while the few Apterous species are, by habit, easily assigned to their proper station in the family. He has, however, employed the principle of Spinola for the distinctive characters of his secondary groups, the Bracones and Bassi, a division which is accordingly defective in a similar degree. The difficulty of applying such a test appears from the fact that this most accurate observer has made glaring transpositions (I am acquainted with but two Aphidius ephippium and Alysia aptera) even among the genera strictly reducible to the lines of his own method. Professor Fallen, in a recent Essay, while he adopts the primary division of Von Essenbeck, has rejected these minor groups; but in reducing the number and extending the limits of the genera, has produced an arrangement which seems less simple and natural. Of the genera, seven had been previously established (but not all equally well defined) by Fabricius,Latreille, Schrank and Jurine; the rest we owe to the labours of the same accomplished naturalist, who has besides described at length a considerable number of the European species; of which, also, several will be found dispersed among the Fabrician genera, and more collected and arranged in the Ligurian Fauna of Spinola. Seven species only are noticed by Linne; two of which are placed among his Ichneumones majores, four with the minuti, and one is appended to thegenus Cynips.  The little that is known of their instincts and economy is to be found in the pages of Reamur, and of the incomparable Swede, in patient observation almost his equal, and his systematic views (may I not say) unrivalled among his contemporaries. A few of the more familiar species have also been figured, and their habits noticed, by some of the older writers upon insects, as Madame Merian, Frisch etc.; and some interesting contributions to their history, in recent publications, are to be consulted under their respective heads."

List of Braconidae Described in An essay on the classification of the parasitic Hymenoptera of Britain which correspond with the Ichneumones minuti of Linnaeus

A
abdita Haliday, 1838 
abjectum (Haliday, 1833, Aphidius) 
accinctus (Haliday, 1835, Leiophron)
aceris (Haliday, 1833, Aphidius)
adducta (Haliday, 1839, Alysia) 
aemula (Haliday, 1836, Opius) 
aethiops (Haliday, 1837, Opius) 
albipennis (Haliday, 1834, Microgaster) 
albipes (Haliday, 1839, Alysia) 
alexis Haliday, 1834.
ambiguus (Haliday, 1834, Aphidius) 
ambulans Haliday, 1835 
ampliator (Haliday, 1839, Alysia) 
ancilla (Haliday, 1838, Alysia)
angelicae (Haliday, 1833, Aphidius)
angustula (Haliday, 1838, Alysia) 
annularis (Haliday, 1834, Microgaster) 
apicalis Haliday, 1833 
arenarius (Haliday, 1834, Microgaster)
arundinis Haliday, 1834
asteris Haliday, 1834 
auctus (Haliday, 1833, Aphidius) 
aurora (Haliday, 1838, Alysia)
avenae Haliday, 1834

B
bajulus (Haliday, 1837, Opius) 
biglumis (Haliday, 1836, Rogas)
braconius Haliday, 1833 
brevicollis Haliday, 1835 
brevicornis (Haliday, 1833, Aphidius)

C
caelatus (Haliday, 1837, Opius) 
caesa (Haliday, 1837, Opius) 
calceata (Haliday, 1834, Microgaster) 
caligatus (Haliday, 1835, Meteorus) 
callidus (Haliday, 1834, Microgaster)
candidata (Haliday, 1834, Microgaster) 
catenator (Haliday, 1836, Rogas) 
caricis (Haliday, 1833, Aphidius) 
celsus Haliday, 1837
centaureae (Haliday, 1833, Aphidius) 
cerealium Haliday, 1835 
cinctus (Haliday, 1839, Alysia) 
cirsii Haliday, 1834 
clandestina (Haliday, 1839, Alysia) 
clarus Haliday, 1836 
clavator Haliday, 1833 
colon (Haliday, 1835, Perilitus) 
compressa (Haliday, 1838, Alysia) 
concinnum (Haliday, 1838, Alysia)
conspurcator (Haliday, 1838, Alysia) 
consularis (Haliday, 1834, Microgaster)
contaminatus (Haliday, 1834, Microgaster) 
contracta Haliday, 1833 Alysia GENOTYPE of ALLOEA 
crepidis (Haliday, 1834, Aphidius) 
cruentatus Haliday, 1833 
cunctator (Haliday, 1836, Rogas) 
cuspidatus (Haliday, 1833, Ancylus)

D
decora (Haliday, 1834, Microgaster) 
decorator (Haliday, 1836, Rogas) 
dilecta (Haliday, 1834, Microgaster) 
diremptus (Haliday, 1839, Alysia)
dispar (Haliday, 1833, Rogas) 
docilis (Haliday, 1837, Opius)
dorsale (Haliday, 1833, Aphidius)

E
edentatus (Haliday, 1835, Leiophron) 
eglanteriae Haliday, 1834
elaphus Haliday, 1833 
ephippium (Haliday, 1834, Aphidius) 
equestris (Haliday, 1834, Microgaster)
ervi Haliday, 1834 
eugenia (Haliday, 1838, Alysia)
eunice (Haliday, 1838, Alysia)
excrucians (Haliday, 1835, Leiophron)
excubitor (Haliday, 1836, Rogas)
exiguus (Haliday, 1834, Aphidius)
exiguus (Haliday, 1834, Microgaster)
exilis (Haliday, 1834, Microgaster)
exilis Haliday, 1837

F
filator (Haliday, 1835, Perilitus) 
flavifrons Haliday, 1840
flavinode (Haliday, 1833, Aphidius) 
flavipes (Haliday, 1838, Alysia) 
flavipes (Haliday, 1835, Helcon) 
flaviventris (Haliday, 1838, Alysia)
florimela (Haliday, 1838, Alysia) 
foveolus (Haliday, 1839, Alysia) 
fragilis (Haliday, 1836, Rogas) 
fucicola (Haliday, 1838, Alysia) 
fulgidum (Haliday, 1837, Opius) 
fuliginosa (Haliday, 1838, Alysia) 
fulvicornis (Haliday, 1838, Alysia)
fulvipes (Haliday, 1835, Helcon)
fulvipes (Haliday, 1834, Microgaster) 
fumatus Haliday, 1834
funestus (Haliday, 1836, Rogas)
fuscula (Haliday, 1839, Alysia)
fuscicornis (Haliday, 1838, Alysia)

G
galatea (Haliday, 1838, Alysia) 
germanus (Haliday, 1834, Acaelius) 
gilvipes (Haliday, 1839, Alysia)

H
haemorrhoeus (Haliday, 1837, Opius) 
hariolator (Haliday, 1836, Rogas) 
hastatus Haliday, 1835 
heraclei (Haliday, 1833, Aphidius)
hilaris (Haliday, 1834, Microgaster)

I
idalius (Haliday, 1833, Perilitus) 
immunis (Haliday, 1834, Microgaster) 
imperator (Haliday, 1836, Rogas) 
indagator (Haliday, 1836, Rogas) 
infulata (Haliday, 1834, Aphidius)
infumata (Haliday, 1834, Microgaster)
ingratus (Haliday, 1834, Microgaster) 
infima (Haliday, 1834, Microgaster) 
intacta (Haliday, 1835, Leiophron)
intricata (Haliday, 1834, Microgaster)
isabella (Haliday, 1838, Alysia)

J
jaculans (Haliday, 1838, Alysia) 
jaculator (Haliday, 1835, Perilitus)

L
lacertosus (Haliday, 1833, Aphidius) 
lancifer (Haliday, 1836, Dyscolus) 
laricis (Haliday, 1834, Aphidius)
lateralis (Haliday, 1839, Alysia) 
lateralis (Haliday, 1834, Microgaster) 
lepidus (Haliday, 1835, Helcon) 
leptogaster (Haliday, 1839, Alysia) 
letifer (Haliday, 1833, Aphidius) 
leucopterus (Haliday, 1834, Aphidius) 
lituratus (Haliday, 1835, Leiophron)
livida (Haliday, 1838, Alysia) 
lucia Haliday, 1838 Alysia
lucicola Haliday, 1838 Alysia
luctuosa Haliday, 1834 
lugens (Haliday, 1839, Alysia) 
lugens Haliday, 1837 
lustrator (Haliday, 1836, Rogas) 
lutescens Haliday, 1834
lymphata (Haliday, 1839, Alysia)

M
macrospila (Haliday, 1839, Alysia) 
marginalis (Haliday, 1839, Alysia) 
maria (Haliday, 1838, Alysia)
maritima (Haliday, 1838, Alysia) 
matricariae Haliday, 1834 
mediator (Haliday, 1834, Microgaster) 
meditator (Haliday, 1836, Rogas) 
meridiana Haliday, 1834 
messoria Haliday, 1834 
micropterus (Haliday, 1835, Perilitus) 
minutus (Haliday, 1833, Aphidius)
mitis (Haliday, 1833, Leiophron)
muricatus (Haliday, 1833, Ancylus)

N
naiadum (Haliday, 1839, Alysia) 
nephele (Haliday, 1838, Alysia) 
nereidum (Haliday, 1839, Alysia)
nervosus (Haliday, 1833, Aphidius)
nina (Haliday, 1838, Alysia) 
nobilis (Haliday, 1834, Rogas)

O
oleraceus Haliday, 1833

P
pacta (Haliday, 1837, Opius) 
paganus Haliday, 1835 
[pallidinotus Haliday, 1834 nom. nud.]
pallidus (Haliday, 1833, Aphidius) 
pallipes Haliday, 1835
pendulus Haliday, 1837 
phoenicura (Haliday, 1839, Alysia) 
picinervis (Haliday, 1838, Alysia)
picipes (Haliday, 1835, Leiophron) 
picipes (Haliday, 1835, Helcon)
picta (Haliday, 1834, Aphidius) 
pini (Haliday, 1834, Aphidius) 
placida (Haliday, 1834, Microgaster) 
placidus (Haliday, 1837, Opius) 
podagrica (Haliday, 1839, Alysia) 
popularis (Haliday, 1834, Microgaster) 
posticus (Haliday, 1839, Alysia) 
praepotens (Haliday, 1834, Microgaster)
praetextata (Haliday, 1834, Microgaster)
procera (Haliday, 1839, Alysia)
profligator (Haliday, 1835, Perilitus) 
puber (Haliday, 1835, Helcon) 
pullata (Haliday, 1838, Alysia) 
pulverosus (Haliday, 1839, Alysia) 
punctigera (Haliday, 1838, Alysia)

R
ribis Haliday, 1834 
rosae Haliday, 1833 
rubripes (Haliday, 1834, Microgaster) 
ruficrus (Haliday, 1834, Microgaster) 
rufilabris Haliday, 1833 
rufinotata (Haliday, 1838, Alysia) 
russata (Haliday, 1834, Microgaster) 
rusticus (Haliday, 1837, Opius)

S
saeva (Haliday, 1837, Opius) 
salicis Haliday, 1834 
secalis Haliday, 1833 
semirugosa (Haliday, 1839, Alysia) 
semistriatus (Haliday, 1835, Helcon) 
sodalis (Haliday, 1834, Microgaster) 
spartii Haliday, 1835
spectabilis (Haliday, 1834, Microgaster) 
speculator (Haliday, 1835, Helcon)
speculum (Haliday, 1838, Alysia) 
spinolae Haliday, 1834 
spretus Haliday, 1836 
stramineipes (Haliday, 1839, Alysia) 
striatula (Haliday, 1839, Alysia) 
sylvaticus (Haliday, 1837, Opius) 
sylvia (Haliday, 1839, Alysia)

T
tabidus (Haliday, 1836, Rogas)
tacita (Haliday, 1837, Opius) 
talaris (Haliday, 1839, Alysia) 
temporale (Fischer, 1958, Opius)
temula (Haliday, 1839, Alysia) 
tibialis (Haliday, 1835, Helcon) 
tripudians Haliday, 1835 
trivialis Haliday, 1835

U
uliginosus (Haliday, 1839, Alysia) 
umbellatarum (Haliday, 1834, Microgaster)
umbratilis Haliday, 1833 
urticae Haliday, 1834

V
validus (Haliday, 1833, Aphidius) 
venustum (Haliday, 1838, Alysia)
vestalis (Haliday, 1834, Microgaster) 
vestigator (Haliday, 1836, Rogas) 
vexator (Haliday, 1835, Perilitus) 
 victus (Haliday, 1837, Opius) 
vindex Haliday, 1837 
[viminalis Haliday, 1834 nom. nud.]
volucre (Haliday, 1833, Aphidius)

W
wesmaelii (Haliday, 1837, Opius)

External links

BHL Digitised Entomological Magazine

Entomological literature